Thomas Julius Anton (September 28, 1934, Worcester, Massachusetts – June 6, 2006) was an American professor of political science and dean of the faculty at Brown University.

Anton graduated 1956 at Clark University, magna cum laude. He was awarded a Doctor of Philosophy in politics at Princeton.

Anton has been a professor in political science at universities in Illinois, Stockholm, Michigan, and at Brown University.

In 1967 he was awarded a Guggenheim Fellowship.

Select bibliography

References

External links
Princeton.edu
University of Michigan

Clark University alumni
2006 deaths
1934 births
Brown University faculty
University of Illinois faculty
Academic staff of Stockholm University
University of Michigan faculty
20th-century American academics
20th-century political scientists